Ezio Brevi (born 20 January 1970, in Rome) is an Italian association football manager and former player, currently serving as head coach of Serie D side Voluntas Spoleto. Throughout his playing career, he played as a midfielder.

Career

Player 
He played from 1991 to 2010 for Corsico, Pro Sesto, Fiorenzuola, Triestina, Ternana, Reggina, Genoa, Catania, Siena, Venezia and Como.

Coach 
He passed his category 2 coaching exam in 2011 (UEFA A License), which made him eligible to coach Lega Pro teams or below. He also obtained a UEFA B License in 2008.

In the 2010–11 season Brevi was the coach of Sporting Terni in Serie D.

Since the 2011–12 season he has serves as the head coach of Serie D side Voluntas Spoleto

Personal life 
Ezio's older brother, Oscar, was also a footballer and is also currently a manager, who last served as head coach of Cremonese.

References

External links
Gazzetta dello Sports player profile 

1970 births
Living people
Italian footballers
Association football defenders
Genoa C.F.C. players
U.S. Triestina Calcio 1918 players
Catania S.S.D. players
Reggina 1914 players
Ternana Calcio players
A.C.N. Siena 1904 players
S.S.D. Pro Sesto players
Venezia F.C. players
Como 1907 players
U.S. Fiorenzuola 1922 S.S. players
Serie A players